Ruchyi is the name of several  rural localities in Russia.

Arkhangelsk Oblast
As of 2022, two rural localities in Arkhangelsk Oblast bear this name:
Ruchyi, Mezensky District, Arkhangelsk Oblast, a selo in Ruchyevsky Selsoviet of Mezensky District
Ruchyi, Pinezhsky District, Arkhangelsk Oblast, a settlement in Lavelsky Selsoviet of Pinezhsky District

Kaliningrad Oblast
As of 2022, one rural locality in Kaliningrad Oblast bears this name:
Ruchyi, Kaliningrad Oblast, a settlement in Znamensky Rural Okrug of Gvardeysky District

Leningrad Oblast
As of 2022, six rural localities in Leningrad Oblast bear this name:
Ruchyi, Kingiseppsky District, Leningrad Oblast, a village in Vistinskoye Settlement Municipal Formation of Kingiseppsky District
Ruchyi, Kirovsky District, Leningrad Oblast, a village in Sukhovskoye Settlement Municipal Formation of Kirovsky District
Ruchyi, Luzhsky District, Leningrad Oblast, a village in Dzerzhinskoye Settlement Municipal Formation of Luzhsky District
Ruchyi, Tosnensky District, Leningrad Oblast, a village in Trubnikoborskoye Settlement Municipal Formation of Tosnensky District
Ruchyi, Volkhovsky District, Leningrad Oblast, a village in Pashskoye Settlement Municipal Formation of Volkhovsky District
Ruchyi, Vyborgsky District, Leningrad Oblast, a logging depot settlement under the administrative jurisdiction of Kamennogorskoye Settlement Municipal Formation of Vyborgsky District

Murmansk Oblast
As of 2022, one rural locality in Murmansk Oblast bears this name:
Ruchyi, Murmansk Oblast, a railway station in Belomorsky Territorial Okrug of Kandalakshsky District

Nizhny Novgorod Oblast
As of 2022, one rural locality in Nizhny Novgorod Oblast bears this name:
Ruchyi, Nizhny Novgorod Oblast, a village in Murzitsky Selsoviet of Sechenovsky District

Novgorod Oblast
As of 2022, seven rural localities in Novgorod Oblast bear this name:
Ruchyi, Krestetsky District, Novgorod Oblast, a village in Ruchyevskoye Settlement of Krestetsky District
Ruchyi, Lyubytinsky District, Novgorod Oblast, a village under the administrative jurisdiction of the urban-type settlement of Lyubytino, Lyubytinsky District
Ruchyi, Poddorsky District, Novgorod Oblast, a village in Poddorskoye Settlement of Poddorsky District
Ruchyi, Podgoshchskoye Settlement, Shimsky District, Novgorod Oblast, a village in Podgoshchskoye Settlement of Shimsky District
Ruchyi, Shimsk, Shimsky District, Novgorod Oblast, a village under the administrative jurisdiction of the urban-type settlement of Shimsk, Shimsky District
Ruchyi, Valdaysky District, Novgorod Oblast, a village in Semenovshchinskoye Settlement of Valdaysky District
Ruchyi, Volotovsky District, Novgorod Oblast, a village in Gorskoye Settlement of Volotovsky District

Pskov Oblast
As of 2022, five rural localities in Pskov Oblast bear this name:
Ruchyi, Bezhanitsky District, Pskov Oblast, a village in Bezhanitsky District
Ruchyi, Dedovichsky District, Pskov Oblast, a village in Dedovichsky District
Ruchyi, Dnovsky District, Pskov Oblast, a village in Dnovsky District
Ruchyi, Gdovsky District, Pskov Oblast, a village in Gdovsky District
Ruchyi, Palkinsky District, Pskov Oblast, a village in Palkinsky District

Sakhalin Oblast
As of 2022, one rural locality in Sakhalin Oblast bears this name:
Ruchyi, Sakhalin Oblast, a selo in Dolinsky District

Tver Oblast
As of 2022, four rural localities in Tver Oblast bear this name:
Ruchyi, Andreapolsky District, Tver Oblast, a village in Andreapolsky District
Ruchyi, Kimrsky District, Tver Oblast, a village in Kimrsky District
Ruchyi, Konakovsky District, Tver Oblast, a village in Konakovsky District
Ruchyi, Rameshkovsky District, Tver Oblast, a village in Rameshkovsky District

Vologda Oblast
As of 2022, one rural locality in Vologda Oblast bears this name:
Ruchyi, Vologda Oblast, a village in Nikolo-Ramensky Selsoviet of Cherepovetsky District